San Cesario sul Panaro is a comune (municipality) in the Province of Modena in the Italian region Emilia-Romagna, located about  northwest of Bologna and about  southeast of Modena. Sports car manufacturer Pagani is located here. The town has a Romanesque-style church dedicated to Saint Caesarius of Terracina.

The battle of San Cesario took place in the area in August 1229.

References

External links
 Official website

Cities and towns in Emilia-Romagna